Red Sky at Morning is a 1944 Australian melodrama set during the 19th century. It features an early screen performance by Peter Finch, who plays a convict who falls in love with the wife of a sea captain.

Synopsis
In 1812 Australia, Alicia Farley flees from her sadistic husband, Captain Farley. During a storm, she takes refuge in an inn in Parramatta and forms a relationship with Irish rebel Michael. Captain Farley tracks her down but she manages to escape with Michael and they both leave the country.

Cast
Peter Finch as Michael
Jean McAllister as Alicia
John Alden as Captain Farley
Dorothea Dunstan as Emma
Desmond Rolfe as innkeeper
Dorothy Whiteley as innkeeper's wife

Original play

The script was adapted from a play by Dymphna Cusack which had been first performed at Sydney Player's Club in September 1935 and adapted for radio in 1938. It was later revived in 1939.

The play was one of the few Australian plays to be published during World War II. It was often produced on radio and in amateur theatres during the subsequent years.

Noted critic Leslie Rees wrote of the play that:
An undertone of passionate resentment against injustice and coercion is heard, but there is also a mannered wit and an acute realisation of character, a clear-cut picture of the times. It is a play of style. Against these considerable merits must be men tioned a sparseness of action, especially the failure to satisfy expectations in the second act. However, the texture of the speech in this play is so fine, the quality of compassion so moving, that such a fault does not, to my mind at any rate, become paramount. To play a curtain-raiser in the same programme would help conceal the deficiency.

Production
The film was mostly shot at Rupert Kathner's small studio in North Sydney during mid 1943, with some exteriors in Windsor and Mulgoa.

Release
In 1944 the film was rejected for registration under the quality clause of the New South Wales Film Quota Act and it only received sporadic distribution.

UK Release
In 1948 a 48-minute version of the film was screened in England by the distributor Carlyle Pictures, and received bad reviews. Kinematograph Weekly called the movie:
Heavy and vague in plot, badly acted, crudely dialogued and staged with touching economy, it fails utterly to justify its lengthy journey from 'Down Under.' And that's putting it mildly... Peter Finch, Jean McAllister, and John Alden... all exaggerate. The supporting players are, if possible, even worse... The time of the play is 1812, and the locale is Australian, but little else is clear. Incredibly old-fashioned and in articulate, it gets many unintentional laughs and might easily be mistaken for burlesque and parody.
The Monthly Film Bulletin called it:
A thoroughly boring film which has absolutely nothing to justify its production. The story is weak, the settings are extremely monotonous, being almost entirely restricted to the interior of a house, and all the sound effects come from "off stage". In fact, this might well have been a photographed play, amateurishly produced. The cast are stiff and do little to bring to life the characters they play. Any semblance of good dialogue there might have been is lost by the extremely poor recording, and the quality of the photography is appalling.

Re-release
In 1948 Gordon Wharton of Austral-American arranged for Ray Rushmer to distribute the film. Rushmer arranged for several changes to be made by Sydney filmmaker James Pearson, including a new opening and ending. The film was retitled Escape at Dawn and ran for 55 minutes. It was re-released in England under that title, emphasising the presence of Peter Finch in the cast.

Preservation status
Red Sky at Morning is now considered a lost film.

See also
List of lost films

References

External links

Red Sky at Morning at National Film and Sound Archive
Red Sky at Morning at Oz Movies

1944 films
Australian drama films
1944 drama films
Australian films based on plays
Lost Australian films
Australian black-and-white films
Melodrama films
1940s lost films
Lost drama films
1940s Australian films